Ananda Dassanayake (16 April 1920 – 9 August 2012) was a Sri Lankan politician belonging to the Sri Lanka Freedom Party. He was the Governor of Uva Province and Southern Province of Sri Lanka. He was a member of the Sri Lankan Parliament for 17 years.

References

1920 births
2012 deaths
Members of the 8th Parliament of Sri Lanka
Governors of Southern Province, Sri Lanka
Governors of Uva Province
Sri Lankan Buddhists
Sri Lanka Freedom Party politicians
Place of birth missing
Sinhalese politicians